Man Down is a British television sitcom which was broadcast from 18 October 2013 to 29 November 2017. It was broadcast on Channel 4 and stars Greg Davies as Dan Davies, who is a man undergoing a midlife crisis.

Channel 4 commissioned an additional 25-minute Christmas special before the first series aired, and a second series was announced during Davies's live tour "The Back of My Mum's Head", though this was prior to Rik Mayall's death in June 2014. Following Mayall's death, Davies met with Channel 4 to discuss the future of the show, Mayall having been intended to have a more prominent role in the second series. The series returned for a second Christmas special in 2014, a second series in 2015, a third in 2016, and a fourth in 2017.

Plot
Man Down centers on Dan Davies, a man in his forties who lives with his parents and is suffering a midlife crisis. He frequents Bob's Cafe, where he meets up with Jo and Brian, his friends from school. He hates his job as a secondary school drama teacher. His long-term girlfriend Naomi breaks up with him at the beginning of series 1 and during the rest of the first series, he makes several failed attempts to win her back. From the Christmas specials through to the end of series 3, he pursues young, highly attractive deputy headmistress Emma. During series 4, they have a son together, although Dan and Emma are not a couple.

Cast

Main cast
 Greg Davies as Daniel "Dan" Davies
 Roisin Conaty as Jo Bellingham
 Mike Wozniak as Brian Clive Ames
 Gwyneth Powell as Polly Davies (Mum)
 Rik Mayall as Richard Davies (Dad) (series 1 - 2013 special)
 Deirdre Mullins as Naomi (series 1)
 Jeany Spark as Emma Lipsey
 Stephanie Cole as Nesta (2014 special – series 4)

Recurring cast
 Ashley McGuire as Shakira
 Madeleine Harris as Karen (series 1–3)
 Alfie Davis as Dennis (series 1–3)
 Frankie Akhurst as Robin (series 2–3)
 George Bothamley as Maurice (series 1)
 Geoffrey Sergison as Mickey Two Face
 Stephen Morrison as Community officer
 Annette Badland as Mrs Wigmore (series 1–2)
 Ramon Tikaram as Dom (series 1–2)
 Daniel Adegboyega as Sam (series 2–4)
 Elliot Levey as Mr Hogan (series 2–4)
 Steven Berkoff as Mr Klackov (series 3)
 Mark Hamill as Bob (series 3)
 Tony Robinson as Daedalus aka 'Daddy' (series 3-4)
 Isy Suttie as Ally (series 3–4)
 Ruth Bratt as Carol (series 4)
 Rihanna Joy Hosmer as Josephine (series 4)
 Michael Bunani as Jason (series 4)
 Sam Hunt as Kevin (series 4)
 Max Gill as Gregory (series 4)

Writers
 Greg Davies
 Stephen Morrison
 Sian Harries
 Ed Gamble
 Mike Wozniak
 Richard Herring (additional material)
 Andrew Collins (script editor)
 Barry Castagnola
 Lloyd Langford
 Roisin Conaty
 Carl Rice

Locations

The majority of exterior scenes are filmed in and around Watford and South Oxhey, Hertfordshire.
Their local pub is filmed in South Oxhey shops as well as the bakery in an earlier series when Dan buys a massive cake.

Lower Charles Street in Camberley, Surrey, is featured in episode 1, season 1.

The car park scene in episode 6 of series 4 is filmed in Cassiobury Park, Watford.

Dan's house exterior filmed in Kendrick Road, Reading, Berkshire. Scenes in both the hospitals and police stations were filmed at Wimbledon Film and TV Studios. The school during the show was St Clement Danes school near Chorleywood, Hertfordshire, featuring their Barbirolli hall and drama facilities.

The tailors in episode one and episode six were filmed in Farncombe, Surrey.

The exterior of "Bob's Cafe" is the exterior of "The Nile Cafe" on the corner of Nile St and Custance St, London N1.

The Elephant & Castle pub in episode 6 in series 2 is the Elephant & Castle pub, Wheathampstead, Hertfordshire.

The pub filmed in series 4 episode 3 is The Horns, Hempstead Road, Watford. Then the baby and push chair scene is outside Watford Town Hall and the main underpass.

The church scenes in which Dan attends for butcher's funeral and his son's christening is filmed in Hanwell, Greater London.

Emma Lipsey's parent's house is in Orchard Close on the Cassiobury Estate.

Episodes
Viewing figures from BARB.

Series overview

Series 1 (2013)

Specials (2013–14)

Series 2 (2015)

Series 3 (2016)

Series 4 (2017)
On 8 November 2016 Greg Davies officially confirmed the renewal of the show for a fourth series consisting of 6 episodes.

Cancellation
In 2017, Channel 4 announced it would not be renewing Man Down for a fifth series.

International broadcast
The series premiered in Australia on 12 January 2015 on SBS One.

Notes

References

External links
 
 
 

2013 British television series debuts
2017 British television series endings
2010s British sitcoms
2010s high school television series
British high school television series
Channel 4 sitcoms
English-language television shows
Midlife crisis in television
Television series about dysfunctional families
Television series about educators
Television series by ITV Studios